Dennis McDonald (born July 14, 1938) was an American politician in the state of Florida.

McDonald was born in Brookfield, Illinois. He attended Jacksonville University and is a general agent of life insurance and mutual funds. He served as a Republican in the Florida House of Representatives from 1970 to 1972 representing the 5th district, and from 1973 to 1978, representing the 57th district.

References

Living people
1938 births
Republican Party members of the Florida House of Representatives
People from Brookfield, Illinois